Tuggle is a surname. Notable people with the surname include:

Anthony Tuggle (born 1963), American football player
Brett Tuggle (1951–2022), American singer-songwriter
Carrie A. Tuggle (1858–1924), African-American educator, philanthropist and social activist
Jessie Tuggle (born 1965), American football player
John Tuggle (1961-1986), American football player
Justin Tuggle (born 1990), American-Canadian football player
Kenneth H. Tuggle (1904–1978), American politician
Mark Tuggle, American politician
Richard Tuggle (born 1948), American film director and screenwriter
Robert Tuggle (1932–2016), American music writer

See also
Tuggle, Virginia
Tuggle (Kirby character)